St Nicholas Primary School is a coeducational primary school in Newland, Kingston upon Hull, England, for pupils aged 4 to 11.

Details
The school is located in the Newland area of West Hull. This school was built around 1897 in a Renaissance Revival style, now with late twentieth-century additions, and is now a Grade II listed building.

History
For the first 108 years of its history, the school was run by The Port of Hull Society for the Religious Instruction of Seamen, founded in 1821, concerned with the welfare of sailor's orphans. In 1950 it changed its name to The Sailors' Children's Society.

In 2005 an agreement was reached with Hull City Council to take over responsibility for the school.

In August 2015 the school converted to academy status.

References

External links
 The Sailors' Children's Society

Primary schools in Kingston upon Hull
Educational institutions established in 1897
1897 establishments in England
Academies in Kingston upon Hull